Usage share may refer to:

Usage share of BitTorrent clients
Usage share of instant messaging clients
Usage share of operating systems
Usage share of web browsers
Usage share of web search engines

See also
Market share